Fuhlensee is a lake in Holstein Switzerland, in the North German state of Schleswig-Holstein.

It lies on the River Schwentine between the Kronsee (upstream) and the Lanker See (downstream), south of Wahlstorf Manor House.

There is a snack bar on the northern shore for boaters.

Lakes of Schleswig-Holstein